The 2010–11 Algerian Ligue Professionnelle 2 is the forty-seventh season of the Algerian Ligue Professionnelle 2 since its establishment in 1962. A total of 16 teams are contesting the league. The league was scheduled to start on September 24, 2010.

Overview 
At the start of the season, the name of the league was changed to Ligue Professionnelle 2 from Algerian Championnat National 2 to reflect the professionalization of the league.

Promotion and relegation 
Teams relegated from 2009-10 Algerian Championnat National
 CA Batna
 MSP Batna
 NA Hussein Dey

Teams and stadiums

League table

Results

Season statistics

Top scorers

Top assistants

Scoring
 Total number of goals scored: 72
 Average goals scored per match: 1.8
 First goal of the season: Salim Hanifi for RC Kouba against JSM Skikda (24 September 2010).
 First penalty kick of the season: Samir Bourenane (scored) for MO Constantine against ES Mostaganem (24 September 2010).

See also
 2010–11 Algerian Ligue Professionnelle 1
 2010–11 Algerian Cup

References

Algerian Ligue 2 seasons
2010–11 in Algerian football leagues
Algeria